Bohemond (or Bohemund) of Antioch may refer to:

Bohemond I of Antioch (ruled 1098–1111)
Bohemond II of Antioch (r. 1111–1130)
Bohemond III of Antioch (r. 1163–1201)
Bohemond IV of Antioch (r. 1201–1216, 1219–1233)
Bohemond V of Antioch (r. 1233–1252)
Bohemond VI of Antioch (r. 1252–1275), lost Antioch in 1268
Bohemond VII of Antioch (r. 1275–1287), nominal prince, ruled Tripoli